Košetice is a municipality and village in Pelhřimov District in the Vysočina Region of the Czech Republic. It has about 700 inhabitants.

Administrative parts
The village of Nová Ves is an administrative part of Košetice.

References

Villages in Pelhřimov District